Reynaldo Valera Guardiano, better known as Rey Valera (born 4 May 1954), is a Filipino singer, songwriter, music director, film scorer and television host. He wrote and produced songs that were recorded by various singers, most notably Sharon Cuneta. Regarded as one of the pillars and icons of Original Pilipino Music (OPM). He was a judge of the singing contest Sing Galing!. He was a former head judge of the singing contest segment "Tawag ng Tanghalan" in a variety noontime show It's Showtime. He is the cousin of former Abra Governor Vicente P. Valera.

Career 
Valera started his recording career in 1977 after becoming a band member from a group called Electric Hair Band for seven years. He waxed his first single as a solo singer – songwriter with the song "Ako si Superman", which he wrote supposedly for Rico J. Puno. His former boss at Vicor Records gave him the opportunity to sing his song and at the same time hired him as one of Vicor's in-house producers. Valera wrote the song "Mr. D.J." and "Kahit Maputi na ang Buhok Ko" for Sharon Cuneta as part of the album DJ's Pet, released in 1978.

Valera also made songs for other artists such as Rico Puno's "Sorry Na, Pwede Ba", "Daigdig Ng Ala-ala"; Geraldine's "Pangako"; Pol Enriquez' "Ayoko na Sa 'Yo" and many more. While he made songs for his peers, he made albums for himself such as Naaalala Ka, Rey Valera Vol. 2, Walang Kapalit, Hello, The Rey Valera Christmas Album, Gabay Mo Ako, Rey Valera's Greatest Hits Vol. 1, Rey Valera's Greatest Hits Vol. 2, Pirapirasong Ala-ala, Sa Kabila Ng Lahat, Kung Sakaling Iibig Muli, FM Ka, AM Ako, Home Sweet Home, Ang Mahalaga, etc. Most of these albums made golds and platinums.

Recently, Vicor Music Corporation compiled Valera's recorded songs in their library in a 4-disc album entitled, Walang Kapalit, as part of Vicor's 40th anniversary.

He was finally inducted to the Philippines Eastwood City Walk of Fame in 2009.

He won the MYX Magna Award 2015 in the recent 2015 MYX Music Awards.

Mr. DJ and Sharon Cuneta 
One of his initial projects as a request from Tito Sotto who was the vice president of the Vicor Music Corporation at that time was to make a song for a twelve-year-old mayor's daughter named Sharon Cuneta. It was a daunting challenge, as Rey initially could not figure out what kind song would be fitting for her; she was too young to be taken seriously to be given a love song, and a bit too old to be given a nursery rhyme.

It dawned upon Rey to write a song about the people who were responsible for playing songs on the radio; the DJs. Wherever radio station the song would be submitted in, it was almost always guaranteed that it would be played as it was their song. The song, Mr. DJ, made remarkable sales on the chart.

Sharon stated in a recent interview by Deborah Kan in Star News Asia, that she has been always thankful for and grateful to Rey, for writing her first hit song. "Mr. DJ".

The two have been friends ever since, and in 1992, Sharon paid tribute to her favorite composer when she recorded Sharon Sings Valera.

When Sharon Cuneta and her then husband Gabby Concepcion separated, Rey composed the song, "Kahit Wala Ka Na" (Even When You're Gone). When Sharon and Rey met at Cinema Audio, she asked why he was not writing songs for her anymore. Rey replied that he did write one for her and submitted the song to VIVA for it to be an inspiration or a battleground for Sharon. Both of them found out that the song has been shelved for two years at VIVA. Sharon immediately recorded the song and used it in her movie, "Single Mother"(former title). It was retitled to "Kahit Wala Ka Na".

Sharon's biggest blockbuster movies were lifted from popular songs of Rey, thus Sharon singing Valera has been an always-winning chemistry.

Rey Valera's impostor 
In 1983, Rey faced one of the worst challenges of both his career, and personal life; an impostor was using his name and was committing crimes, among them were car-napping and rape. The list even extended to marrying numerous women, and even petty crimes like "borrowing" money and personal items, all under Rey Valera's name. Rey made numerous newspaper statements announcing that there is an imposter posing as him. Rey also wrote and released a song entitled, "My Fans Are in Trouble" to warn his fans through the medium of music, with the lyrics depicting his helplessness to stop this impostor. What Rey feared most was not the money, but the physical harm people the impostor had fooled might do to him. Ultimately in 1984, Rey decided to quit show business at the peak of his career to protect his fans and also to make up for the time he lost with his family during his fame. When Rey made a comeback in 1988, he wore his hair long so that his impostor (who had kinky hair), would have a harder time posing as him if the impostor ever resurfaced. The impostor has never been heard from ever since.

Valera now talks about the impostor topic on less serious, even humorous tone, to help forget the traumatic experience it had caused. Looking back, he even dubbed his impostor "Rey Bolero" (Rey the Deceiver / Smooth Talker) when he talks about it to his friends and interviews, which was also mentioned on the "Na-Scam Ka Na Ba" interview on the Filipino television channel QTV 11 which aired around September 2006.

Bubble Gang parody 
In May 2008, a friendlier, funnier impostor had emerged on the Filipino television show Bubble Gang, in the persona of comedian/parodist Michael V. He even used "Rey Bolero" as his screen name. A segment of the show featured Michael V. as Rey Bolero, singing Mas Tanga 'ko Sa'yo ( I'm Dumber Than You Are ) – A parody of one of Rey Valera's well known songs, Pangako Sa'yo ( I Promise To You ). His costume was even patterned after Rey Valera's late 1970s attire.

The idea proved to be a hit, and a second Rey Valera song was soon used on the same show and segment, also by Michael V. himself. The song, "Kung Kailangan Mo Ako" ( If You Need Me ), was parodied into Kung Kailangan Mo Bato ( If You Need A Stone / To Get Stoned—a slang use of the word "stone", as in illegal substance / getting high )

On 31 October of the same year, Rey Valera, and Michael V. as Rey Bolero (now mimicking Valera's clothes and hairstyle at the time) performed a duet and was one of the highlights of the heavily promoted, "taped as live", two-part Bubble Gang 13th Anniversary special. A narration was heard before the two artists entered the stage; "Do the singers that Michael V. impersonate ever get angry?" – (translated from Filipino). They sang a medley of the two previously mentioned parodied songs. The segment ended with Valera mock-swinging his guitar at Michael V., and the former mock-chasing the latter towards the backstage.

Theme songs for soap operas 
Valera's songs are also favorite titles and theme songs of soap operas like Ula, Batang Gubat ("Malayo Pa Ang Umaga"), Sa Sandaling Kailangan Mo Ako ("Kung Kailangan Mo Ako"), Pangako Sa 'Yo ("Pangako"), from ABS-CBN.

Recently, Valera's song's have been revived as theme songs for soap operas. They are: Maging Sino Ka Man (which has spawned a second book, Maging Sino Ka Man: Ang Pagbabalik), Walang Kapalit, Tayong Dalawa and Juan Dela Cruz from ABS-CBN. All of these ABS-CBN shows have turned into a massive hit, making them top-rating and be part of every Filipino's lives.

Writing music and songs for movies 
Valera was film scoring movies during his singing career, but after the trouble his impostor has caused, Rey focused on his musical directing career. He particularly liked scoring music for action films, giving fight scenes and chase sequences fast paced, rock-themed music, which reflects his roots as a rock band member.

Rey's songs made marks also as theme songs and movie titles. These include several Sharon Cuneta movies such as Maging Sino Ka Man, Pangako sa 'Yo, Kahit Wala Ka Na, Tayong Dalawa; Sinasamba Kita, Romansa, Hiwalay; Carnap King, Barumbado, and Baby Ama; Pasong Tirad, The Gregorio del Pilar Story, Tampisaw.

There are very few people are aware that Rey wrote music for movies, even fewer are aware that he also wrote music for R-18 "Bold" films. He accepted making music for movies and considered it an opportunity, as these projects usually pitted his songwriting skills to follow fresh and often unusual themes and topics, often deviating from pop love songs which he was usually typecast into.

The theme song "Ambon" (Raindrop) from the film Tampisaw emphasizes on the singer's hunger and deprivation of love, and that a single "raindrop" of love would be enough for her to live on.

The theme song "Nagpapanggap" (Pretending/Deceiving) from the film Kerida (The Mistress) depicts a person's awareness that her lover is only pretending to love her, and yet she has this pragmatic acceptance and is even thankful that she was loved, no matter how false that love may be.

The theme song "Sa Gitna ng Buhay Ko" (In The Middle of My Life) from the film Naglalayag (Silent Passage) follows the movie's theme of a middle-aged woman falling in love with a man half her age. The song relates to her life as the times of the day, asking questions such as, "why did love arrive at only NOON?"

The Greatest Hitmakers 
In 2002, Rey reunited with his contemporaries Rico J. Puno and Hajji Alejandro in a series of concerts called "Greatest Hits", highlighting the music of their own time. They also launched a VCD recording of their concert. Nonoy Zuñiga and Marco Sison joined the group in the following year. The group continues to perform both locally and internationally

Although they were formally named "The Greatest Hits", the group felt that using the name "The Greatest Hitmakers" was more proper, as the former referred to the 'songs' and not the group members themselves. The group has successfully performed even with the absence of one or two members, usually concentrating on a core trio group ( e.g. Rey, Hajji, Rico / Rey, Hajji, Marco / Rey, Rico, Marco ) and varies between concert to concert, depending on each member's availability. This flexibility of the group's roster combined with miscommunication with the each show's promoter and other reasons has often led to various names for the group such as "The Hitmakers", "The Greatest Hits", "The Great Hitmakers" "GH5", "GH4" and such.

Saling Ket 
In July 2005, Rey Valera released the music album "Panghabangbuhay", with his children's band called "Saling Ket". Whenever possible, Rey has been performing with them in almost all of his performances and still continues to do so.

Induction to Bulacan's Walk of Fame 

On 9 November 2006, Rey was inducted to Bulacan's own "Walk of Fame", in the "Hardin ng Mga Bayani at Sining" ( The Garden of the Heroes and Arts/Artists), Malolos City, Bulacan.

Rey was among the few Bulakeños who was given the title of "Alagad ng Sining at Kultura ng Bulacan", loosely translated as "Disciple of the Arts and Culture of Bulacan", or simply put, Great Artist of Bulacan.

An inductee was given a tile with his/her name on it, and a small pile of a then wet cement to leave a hand print. The names on the Walk of Fame embody the Bulakeños who have brought pride to Bulacan in the fields of arts and culture.

Philippines Eastwood City Walk of Fame Inductee Winner 
In December 2009, Rey is finally inducted to the Philippines Eastwood City Walk of Fame for contributing his singing & composing songs.  Philippines Eastwood City Walk of Fame is similar to the Hollywood Walk of Fame in California, USA.

First Asean IKon Champion – "Pangako" 
On 17 August 2007, Vina Morales won the First Asean IKon Champion with her interpretation of Valera's hit song, "Pangako". The song was used as a theme song for ABS-CBN's soap opera TV series, Pangako Sa 'Yo (2000) and its 2015 remake, which was also sung by Morales.

The Legends of OPM 
 Rey once again performed with Rico J. Puno, and Nonoy Zuñiga, along with Claire dela Fuente, Eva Eugenio and Joey Albert at the Philippine International Convention Center under the name, Legends of OPM. Like its predecessor group, "The Greatest Hitmakers", the concept proved to be a hit, and a repeat performance was done on 5 March of the following year.

MYX Magna Award 2015 Winner 
He won as the MYX Magna Award 2015 Winner for contributing his success as a composer, guitarist, musical director & singer and also a performer.

Movie musical directions and theme songs 
Legend:

(      ) music score only
(    * ) music score and theme song
(   ** ) theme song only
(  *** ) movie title and theme song
( **** ) music score, movie title, theme song (song title same as movie title)

Chronology

Discography

Albums

Studio albums 
Gabay Mo Ako
Hello
Sa Kabila Ng Lahat
Walang Kapalit
The Rey Valera's Christmas Album
Naaalala Ka
Rey Valera
Kung Sakaling Iibig Muli
FM Ka, AM Ako
Pira-Pirasong Ala-Ala

Compilation albums 
Rey Valera's Greatest Hits Vol. 1
Rey Valera's Greatest Hits Vol. 2
Once Again... with Rico J. Puno, Marco Sison and Rey Valera Vol. 1 (with Rico J. Puno & Marco Sison)  (2003, Vicor)
18 Greatest Hits: Rey Valera (2009, Vicor)

Compilation appearances 
18 Inspirational Love Songs (2009, Viva Records)

Singles 
"Maging Sino Ka Man"
"Tayong Dalawa"
"Kung Kailangan Mo Ako"
"Ako Si Superman"
"Naaalala Ka"
"Malayo Pa Ang Umaga" (Originally by Verde & Clarino in 1979)
"Pangako"
"Sinasamba Kita"
"Walang Kapalit"
"Kung Sakaling Iibigin Muli"
"Kung Tayo'y Magkakalayo"

References

External links 

 https://web.archive.org/web/20090311161149/http://www.vicormusic.com/music.asp

1954 births
Filipino OPM composers
Filipino film score composers
20th-century Filipino male singers
Filipino singer-songwriters
Manila sound musicians
Living people
People from Meycauayan
Singers from Bulacan
Male film score composers
Tagalog-language singers
21st-century Filipino male singers